Stories to Awaken the World (醒世恆言; Xingshi Hengyan), is a Chinese story anthology compiled by Feng Menglong and published in 1627, composed of 40 vernacular stories. It follows Stories Old and New (1620) and Stories to Caution the World (1624).

List of stories
Translated titles in this table mainly follow those by Shuhui Yang and Yunqin Yang in  Titles used by other translators are listed as bullet points.

See also
 May you live in interesting times

Notes

References
 Stories to Awaken the World – University of Washington Press

Chinese anthologies
1627 books
Short stories by Feng Menglong
Chinese short story collections